1-Chloro-3,3,3-trifluoropropene (HFO-1233zd) is the unsaturated chlorofluorocarbon with the formula HClC=C(H)CF3.  This colorless gas is of interest as a more environmentally friendly (lower GWP; global warming potential) refrigerant in air conditioners. The compound exists as E- and Z-isomers.  It is prepared by fluorination and dehydrohalogenation reactions starting with 1,1,1,3,3-pentachloropropane.

References

Haloalkenes
Trifluoromethyl compounds
Refrigerants
Organochlorides